Words and Music by Saint Etienne is the eighth studio album by English alternative dance band Saint Etienne, released on 18 May 2012 by Heavenly Recordings. The band announced the album in a Christmas message on their official website on 11 December 2011. The album features collaborations from longtime Saint Etienne associate Ian Catt, as well as Richard X and former Xenomania members Tim Powell and Nick Coler.

Background
According to Saint Etienne's official website, the album is about "how music affects your life. How it defines the way you see the world as a child, how it can get you through bad times in unexpected ways, and how songs you've known all your life can suddenly develop a new attachment, and hurt every time you hear them. More than how it affects and reflects your life though, the album is about believing in music, living your life by its rules."

Composition
The album opens with "Over the Border", a semi-spoken memoir that narrates a first-person coming-of-age tale that is defined by musical milestones. It was the last song recorded for the album, and includes references to the likes of Peter Gabriel, Genesis, Modern English, New Order, Marc Bolan, Top of the Pops, Smash Hits, NME, Factory Records and Postcard Records. The second track "I've Got Your Music" blends "pristine dance-pop keyboards" and "driving electro beats" with Cracknell's "smooth, cool coos", while referencing Donna Summer's 1977 song "I Feel Love". According to lead singer Sarah Cracknell, the song is about "that personal moment of having your own favourite song on your headphones and that feeling of being separate to everything that's going on around you."

"Heading for the Fair", the album's third track, was compared to "the kind of Balearic dance track Boys' Own Records put out in the early 90s", and its lyrics, according to Cracknell, revolve around "[a] girl [who] goes to the fair and meets a guy who spins her round and promises many things and says 'I'll come back next year and we'll run off together' and, of course, next year he just ignores her." Words and Musics fourth track is "Last Days of Disco", a downbeat R&B song featuring symphonic string sections and a "lovely mellifluous" chorus. "Tonight", the fifth track, describes the excitement of attending a gig from a favourite band, incorporating "atmospheric" strings, "butterflies-in-your-stomach" synths and "stuttering" beats.

The sixth track, "Answer Song", was referred to as "a waltzing ballad of epically soulful proportions", and is followed by "Record Doctor", an a cappella song that pays tribute to "a friend blessed with the uncanny ability to find the right song to fit your mood". "Popular", the eighth track, refers to the homonymous music blog run by Pitchfork contributor Tom Ewing, dedicated to reviewing all the UK number-one singles since 1952, with the lyrics namechecking several UK chart-topping titles, including Slade's "Skweeze Me, Pleeze Me", the KLF's "3 a.m. Eternal" and Pussycat's "Mississippi". The track combines "radio-friendly electronics" and Cracknell's "sweet pop-soul vocals". "Twenty Five Years" and "I Threw It All Away"—the album's ninth and twelfth tracks, respectively—are both about bad choices; the latter carries "a hint of baroque pop in its waltz-time and woodwind". Following "Twenty Five Years" is "DJ", which "starts out on the High Street but ends up in the underground club, mixing posh sounding effects and an adrenaline rush of techno synths to play out the song's conceit." It was described as a "nice callback" to the melody of the band's 1994 song "Like a Motorway".

The eleventh track "When I Was Seventeen" is a 1980s rock-inspired number, and its lyrics find Cracknell reminiscing about the time she was living on the King's Road in London at age 17, after having just left home: "I was just having a ball but had no money at all." "Haunted Jukebox" is the album's thirteenth track. Sporting a "mid-'60s soul groove" and "lushly lovely backing vocals", the song's melody and vocal arrangement were perceived by critics as a homage to the Carpenters. Lyrically, the song describes "a blossoming teenage romance built upon a mutual love of records", while noting "how the memories evoked by old music hit harder as you age". Regarding the inspiration behind "Haunted Jukebox", Cracknell said, "There was this bloke I went out with when I was 14, 15. In fact I started my first band with him. And he was really into Adam and the Ants. He once showed me a picture of himself that his sister had taken. And it was him in his bedroom and he'd put a white stripe across his nose. I look back and think, what on earth did I see in him."

Release
A super deluxe edition box set, limited to 1,000 copies, was released in the United Kingdom on 11 June 2012, containing a bonus disc of remixes (also included on the regular deluxe edition) and an exclusive four-track EP, in addition to an enamel badge, four art prints, a giant foldout Ordnance Survey map-style print of the album artwork, and a book packed with photography by Paul Kelly not used in any other format.

In North America, a special edition of the album was released in a cardboard slipcase with a bonus disc titled More Words and Music, featuring ten exclusive tracks. This edition was limited to 3,000 copies, of which 2,700 were sold exclusively on the band's nine-date North American tour in October and November 2012.

The album's cover art is a stylised map of Croydon town centre, designed by Manchester art collective Dorothy. Band member Bob Stanley explained, "They had done this map of a fictional area with all these road names, which were songs. I just got in touch with them and I was like, 'I love this, would you want to do one that was tailor made for us with all of our favorite songs?' They said yes. The general theme of the album is marking a route in your life through music—the idea is that you can follow roads on the map and end up with a playlist of different journeys. There are 312 song titles on the map—it's our hometown."

After being offered as a free download on 24 January 2012, lead single "Tonight" was released as a digital EP on 9 March 2012, and as limited-edition seven-inch and 12-inch vinyl singles on 12 March 2012. "I've Got Your Music" was released as the album's second single on 25 June 2012.

Critical reception

Words and Music by Saint Etienne received widespread acclaim from music critics. At Metacritic, which assigns a normalised rating out of 100 to reviews from mainstream publications, the album received an average score of 82, based on 24 reviews. The Independents Simon Price praised the album as "a masterclass of pop theory and practice in perfect harmony, often within the same song". AllMusic editor Tim Sendra wrote, "About half the record is drenched in nostalgia, vaguely melancholic and introspective [...] The other half of the album is built on bouncing beats, glittering synths, and Cracknell's feather-light vocals, and is designed to be played over radio waves and in sweaty nightclubs", adding that "[t]hese dual aspects of the record mesh perfectly, often on the same song, and Words and Music turns out to be one of the band's most enriching albums, both musically and emotionally." Kevin Ritchie of Now noted the album has "the vitality of today's top 40 dance-pop but is full of the kind of wisdom, wit and warmth that can only come with age. So many bands are content to ape the style of their predecessors, but Saint Etienne have a voice and sophisticated style all their own." In a review for NME, Dan Martin dubbed the album "the soundtrack to your life" and expressed that "while Saint Etienne will always sound like Saint Etienne, these songs are their sharpest in over a decade."

The Guardian journalist Alexis Petridis stated that the album "frequently sounds as dizzy with the joy of pop as Saint Etienne did 20 years ago". Arnold Pan of PopMatters opined, "What makes Words and Music stand out is that it's both polished and personal, a prime example of how a big pop sound can reach out and connect in the most intimate ways. Perhaps Saint Etienne's most fully realized effort and most engaging listen from beginning to end, Words and Music finds the sweet spot between proficient skill and intuitive feel that can be so elusive in pop music." Pitchfork Marc Hogan viewed Words and Music as "Saint Etienne's best LP since 1994 masterpiece Tiger Bay", commenting that "[p]art of what's appealing about Words and Music is the way it maintains a contemporary Top 40 sheen without lowering itself to pandering". Ian Wade, writing for BBC Music, called the album "[w]onderful stuff" and described it as "a fantastic and warm collection of jubilant happy/sad pop moments, delivering all that Saint Etienne are known for". DIYs Martyn Young concluded, "There is perhaps no band with a greater appreciation of the sheer joy and thrill of pop music in its purest form than Saint Etienne. Words And Music By Saint Etienne is not only their own unique take on what pop means to them it is also an incredibly fine album in its own right to add to those records that they so revere." Barry Walters of Spin magazine summarised Words and Music as a "sustained, meticulous love letter to pop culture, the ultimate statement from consummate fans". TC of Clash, however, felt that "[t]here's nothing essentially bad about [the album], but the only maturity in their sound is towards a more ambient quarter. Elevator music not quite, but rising out of the background might be an issue."

Commercial performance
Words and Music by Saint Etienne debuted at number 26 on the UK Albums Chart, selling 4,538 copies in its first week.

Track listing

Notes
  signifies an additional producer
  signifies a remixer

Personnel
Credits adapted from the liner notes of Words and Music by Saint Etienne.

Saint Etienne
 Sarah Cracknell – vocals
 Bob Stanley – keyboards
 Pete Wiggs – keyboards

Additional personnel

 Andrei Basirov – additional programming 
 Ian Catt – production ; acoustic guitar ; bass ; programming ; arrangements ; electric guitar, robot liaison ; mixing 
 Leo Chadburn – recorder 
 Tina Charles – backing vocals 
 Nick Coler – bass, guitar, keyboards, mixing, production, programming 
 Elaine Constantine – band photograph
 CTA Strings – strings 
 Guy Davie – mastering
 Rob Davis – drum programming, guitar, keyboards, mixing, production 
 Stefan Defilet – strings 
 Travis Elborough – liner notes
 Julian Fernandez – project co-ordination
 Bill Hawkes – strings 
 Pete Hofmann – mixing ; additional production 
 Martin Kelly – management
 Paul Kelly – photography, sleeve design
 Piotr Kopek – strings 
 Tim Larcombe – production 
 James McMaster – guitar 
 Merissa Porter – backing vocals 
 Tim Powell – keyboards, production, programming 
 Phil Skegg – Song Map
 Nick Squires – strings 
 Rob Walbourne – drums 
 Andrew Walsh – management
 Richard X – additional production ; mixing 

Deluxe edition bonus disc

 Erol Alkan – additional synths, drums, rework 
 Ian Catt – production 
 Club Clique – additional production, remix 
 Nick Coler – mixing, production 
 Rob Davis – mixing, production 
 Joe Goddard – additional production, remix 
 The Golden Filter – additional production, remix 
 Reed Juenger – additional production, remix 
 Kisses – additional production, remix 
 Jordan Koplowitz – additional production, remix 
 Tim Larcombe – production 
 Tom Middleton – additional production, remix 
 Muddyloop – additional production, remix 
 Richard Norris – additional production, remix 
 Tim Powell – production 
 Raf Rundell – additional production, remix 
 Stay+ – additional production, remix 
 Summer Camp – additional production, remix 
 Dom Thomas – additional production, drums, percussion, synths 
 White Horses – remix 
 Jez Williams – additional production, bass, guitar, synths 

Super deluxe edition box set bonus EP
 Saint Etienne – remix 
 Ian Catt – production ; mixing 
 Nick Coler – mixing, production 
 Debsey – guest vocals

Charts

Release history

References

2012 albums
Albums produced by Richard X
Heavenly Recordings albums
Saint Etienne (band) albums